The Bishop of Sheffield is the Ordinary of the Church of England Diocese of Sheffield in the Province of York.

A similar title was first created as a suffragan see in the Diocese of York in 1901. John Quirk, the only Bishop suffragan of Sheffield assisted the Archbishop of York in overseeing that diocese. Under George V, the Diocese of Sheffield was created out of the south-western part of the Diocese of York in 1914. The bishop's residence is Bishopscroft, Ranmoor — west-south-west of the city centre.

On 31 January 2017, it was announced that Philip North had been nominated to translate to Sheffield before June 2017, but North withdrew his acceptance of the nomination in March officially citing "personal reasons". Since his nomination, there had been a number of public articles challenging the appropriateness of his appointment, based on his rejection of the ordination of priests who are women and the number of priests in Sheffield diocese who are women.

On 7 April 2017, it was announced that Pete Wilcox was to be consecrated Bishop of Sheffield on 22 June 2017. He was elected to the See by the College of Canons of Sheffield Cathedral on 5 May 2017; and his election was confirmed on 5 June 2017 at York Minster.

List of bishops

Assistant bishops
Among those who have served the diocese as assistant bishops have been:
1947–1971: Vincent Gerard, Vicar of Rotherham (until 1960), then Canon Residentiary of Sheffield Cathedral (until 1969) and former Bishop of Waiapu
19631966 (ret.): Michael Hollis, Rector of Todwick (until 1964) and former Bishop in Madras
1943 (ret.)1947 (d.): Samuel Heaslett, retired Bishop of South Tokyo and Presiding Bishop, Nippon Sei Ko Kai

References

External links
 Diocese of Sheffield